Below is a List of Diplomats of France to Hawaii dealing with diplomatic representation in the Kingdom of Hawaii and its successor states the Provisional Government of Hawaii and the Republic of Hawaii before annexation to the United States in 1898. The main diplomatic representative held the title of Commissioner and Consul of France while the second in command went to the Chancellor of the French Legation who often served as Acting Consul in the absence of the appointed Consul.

French ambassadors to Hawaii

Jules Dudoit (1803–1866), from 1837 to 1848
Guillaume Patrice Dillon (c. 1812–1857), from 1848 to 1851 
Louis-Émile Perrin (1810–1862), from 1850 to 1862
Charles de Varigny, 1862 to 1863, acting consul
Germain Marie Maxime Desnoyers, from 1863 to 1866
Paul Bérenger, from 1866 to 1869
Pierre Étienne Théodore Ballieu (1828–1885), from 1869 to 1878.
Charles Pernet, acting consul
Eugene Daloz, from 1878 to 1880
Jules L. Ratard (died 1914), 1881, acting consul
Henri Feer, from 1880 to 1886
Adrien Clement Laurent Cochelet, from 1886, 1887, 1888
Leon Bellaguet, acting consul 1889
Marie Gabriel Georges Bosseront d'Anglade; 1889 to 1892
Jean Antoine Vizzavona, 1892 to 1893, acting consul
Henri Leon Verleye, 1894 to 1895
Jean Antoine Vizzavona, 1896
Louis Pierre Vossion, 1897, 1898

References

Hawaii
 
France